Larry Barretto (May 30, 1890 – December 30, 1971) was an American novelist and war correspondent. He was the author of several books.

His father was Gerard Morris and his mother Laura Brevoort Barretto (a descendant of Hendrick Brevoort, the early New Yorker whose farm became Greenwich Village).

References

1890 births
1971 deaths
People from Larchmont, New York
20th-century American novelists
American male novelists
20th-century American male writers